MetaType1, also stylized as METATYPE1, is a tool for creating Type 1 fonts using MetaPost, developed by the Polish JNS team (Bogusław Jackowski, Janusz Marian Nowacki and Piotr Strzelczyk).

Since Metafont cannot produce outline fonts (vector-based), a new tool was needed to help creating such fonts, primarily for use with TeX, although the OpenType versions of the fonts might be used in any other program. It is less powerful than Metafont since no pens can be used, only filled paths, but it still allows creation of parametric fonts.

Most important fonts produced with MetaType1 are: Latin Modern, Latin Modern Math, TeX Gyre, Antykwa Toruńska, Antykwa Półtawskiego, Kurier and Iwona.

References

 Yannis Haralambous, Fonts and Encodings, O'Reilly 2007, pages 947–956

Notes

External links 
 Homepage of Janusz M. Nowacki with fonts produced with MetaType1
 ftp with the program MetaType1 (Windows)
 MetaType1 for Unices

Free TeX software
Computer-related introductions in 1994